Calixto Avena (1943 – 21 January 2021) was a Colombian footballer who played as a goalkeeper.

Career
Avena played professionally for Millonarios and Junior between 1963 and 1970.

Avena also represented the Colombia national team in qualifying matches for the 1966 FIFA World Cup.

He died from COVID-19 in Santa Cruz de Lorica on 21 January 2021, aged 77, during the COVID-19 pandemic in Colombia.

References

1943 births
2021 deaths
Colombian footballers
Colombia international footballers
Millonarios F.C. players
Atlético Junior footballers
Association football goalkeepers
Deaths from the COVID-19 pandemic in Colombia
People from Córdoba Department